is a football stadium in Shintomi, Miyazaki, Japan. 

It is the home stadium of football club Tegevajaro Miyazaki.

References

External links

Sports venues in Miyazaki Prefecture
Football venues in Japan
Sports venues completed in 2021
2021 establishments in Japan
Tegevajaro Miyazaki